The model usually designated as Lugiato–Lefever equation (LLE) was formulated in 1987 by Luigi Lugiato and René Lefever 
 as a paradigm for spontaneous pattern formation in nonlinear optical systems. The patterns originate from the interaction of a coherent field, that is injected into a resonant optical cavity, with a Kerr medium that fills the cavity.

The same equation governs two types of patterns: stationary patterns that arise in the planes orthogonal with respect to the direction of propagation of light (transverse patterns) and patterns that form in the longitudinal direction (longitudinal patterns), travel along the cavity with the velocity of light in the medium and give rise to a sequence of pulses in the output of the cavity.

The case of longitudinal patterns is intrinsically linked to the phenomenon of “Kerr frequency combs” in microresonators, discovered in 2007 by Tobias Kippenberg and collaborators, that has raised a very lively interest, especially because of the applicative avenue it has opened. 


The equation 

For definiteness, consider a ring cavity (Fig. 2) of very high quality (High-Q cavity).

In the original LLE, one assumes conditions such that the envelope  is independent of the longitudinal variable  (i.e. uniform along the cavity), so that . The equation reads

In the righthand side of Eq.(),  is the normalized amplitude of the input field that is injected into the cavity, 
the second is the decay term, the third is the detuning term, the fourth is the cubic nonlinear term that takes into account the Kerr medium, the last term with the transverse Laplacian  describes diffraction in the paraxial approximation. Conditions of self-focusing are assumed.

We refer to Eq.() as the transverse LLE. Some years later than, there was the formulation of the longitudinal LLE, in which diffraction is replaced by dispersion. The longitudinal LLE reads

Conditions of anomalous dispersion are assumed.

From a mathematical viewpoint, the LLE amounts to a driven, damped, detuned nonlinear Schroedinger equation.

The transverse LLE is in 2D from the spatial viewpoint. The longitudinal LLE is equivalent to the transverse LLE in 1D.

Uniform stationary solutions. Connection with optical bistability. Four-wave mixing and pattern formation.  

Let us focus on the case in which the envelope  is constant, i.e. on the stationary solutions that are independent of all spatial variables.

when  we obtain a curve as that shown in Fig.3.

The curve is -shaped and 
there is an interval of values of  where one has three stationary states. However, the states that lie in the segment with negative slope are unstable, so that in the interval there are two coexisting stable stationary states: this phenomenon is called optical bistability. If the input intensity  is increased and then decreased, one covers a hysteresis cycle.

If we refer to the modes of the empty cavity, in the case of the uniform stationary solutions described by Eq.() the electric field is singlemode, corresponding to the mode of frequency  quasi-resonant with the input frequency .

The cubic Kerr nonlinearity of Eqs.() and  gives rise to four-wave mixing (FWM), which can generate other modes, so that the envelope  displays a spatial pattern: in the transverse plane in the case of Eq.(), along the cavity in the case of Eq.().

Transverse patterns and cavity solitons 
In the transverse case of Eq.() the pattern arises from the interplay of FWM and diffraction.

Actually further FWM processes enter into play, so that  assumes the configuration of a hexagonal pattern (see Fig.5). 

A pattern displays an ordered array of intensity peaks. It is possible to generate also isolated intensity peaks, that are called cavity solitons (see Fig. 6). Since cavity solitons can be “written”and “erased” one by one in the transverse plane like in a blackboard, they are of great interest for applications to optical information processing and telecommunications.

Longitudinal patterns and cavity solitons  
In the longitudinal case of Eq.() the patterns arise from the interplay between FWM and dispersion.

Figure 7 shows an example of the patterns that are generated, and travel along the cavity and out of the cavity. Like in the transverse case, also in the longitudinal configuration single or multiple Kerr cavity solitons can be generated; Figure 8 illustrates the case of a single cavity soliton that circulates in the cavity and produces a sequence of narrow pulses in the output. Such solitons have been observed for the first time in a fiber cavity. 

Microresonator Kerr frequency combs and cavity solitons 
Optical frequency combs constitute an equidistant set of laser frequencies that can be employed to count the cycles of light. This technique, introduced by Theodor Haensch and John Hall using mode-locked lasers, has led to myriad applications. The work  demonstrated the realization of broadband optical frequency combs exploiting the whispering gallery modes activated by a CW laser field injected into a high-Q microresonator filled with a Kerr medium, that gives rise to FWM. Since that time Kerr frequency combs (KFC), whose bandwidth can exceed an octave with repetition rates in the microwave to THz frequencies, have been generated in a wide variety of microresonators; for reviews on this subject see e.g. They offer substantial potential for miniaturization and chip-scale photonic integration, as well as for power reduction. Today KFC generation is a mature field, and this technology has been applied to several areas, including coherent telecommunications, spectroscopy, atomic clocks as well as laser ranging and astrophysical spectrometer calibration.

A key impetus to these developments has been the realization of Kerr cavity solitons in microresonators, opening the possibility of utilizing Kerr cavity solitons in photonic integrated microresonators.

The longitudinal LLE provides a spatio-temporal picture of the involved phenomena, but from the spectral viewpoint its solutions correspond to KFC. The link between the topic of optical KFC and the LLE was theoretically developed in. These authors showed that the LLE (or generalizations including higher order dispersion terms) is the model which describes the generation of KFC and is capable of predicting their properties when the system parameters are varied. The spontaneous formation of spatial patterns and solitons travelling along the cavity described by the LLE is the spatiotemporal equivalent of the frequency combs and governs their features. The rather idealized conditions assumed in the formulation of the LLE, especially the high-Q condition, have been perfectly materialized by the spectacular technological progress that has occurred in the meantime in the field of photonics and has led, in particular, to the discovery of KFC.

Quantum aspects 
The two photons that, as shown in Fig.4, are emitted in symmetrically tilted directions in the FWM process, are in a state of quantum entanglement: they are precisely correlated, for example in energy and momentum. This fact is fundamental for the quantum aspects of optical patterns. For instance, the difference between the intensities of the two symmetrical beams is squeezed, i.e. exhibits fluctuations below the shot noise level; the longitudinal analogue of this phenomenon has been observed experimentally in KFC. In turn, such quantum aspects are basic for the field of quantum imaging.

Review articles 
For reviews on the subject of the LLE, see also.

See also 
Four-wave mixing 
Frequency comb
Kerr frequency comb
Nonlinear Schroedinger equation
Optical bistability
Pattern formation

References 

Solitons
Nonlinear optics
Photonics